The Vivaldi potato is a cultivar of potato bred by HZPC, in the Netherlands, and then passed to 'Naturally Best', based in Lincolnshire, England, who promoted and distributed the potato in the UK. 

Lab studies have shown 'Vivaldi' to be lower in calories and carbohydrates than many other popular potato varieties. Although, Sainsbury's supermarket lists the nutritional details of 'Vivaldi' potatoes and others, which show that 'Vivaldi' salad potatoes contain 81 calories and  carbohydrates per . Also 'Charlotte' new potatoes and Sainsbury's own brand Baby Potatoes contain exactly the same amount of calories and carbohydrates as 'Vivaldi'.

The name was chosen as a reference to Antonio Vivaldi, since, as the potatoes are grown both in the UK and overseas, they are available during all "Four Seasons" of the year. The known parents of 'Vivaldi' are 'TZ 77 148' and 'Monalisa', who are not commonly grown in the UK.

'Vivaldi' is a Second Early variety producing oval tubers with yellow skin and pale yellow flesh and which are resistant to scab. As well as being known as 'weight watcher's potato', it is also referred to as the 'butterless baker', as its creamy texture and flavour mean one does not necessarily need to add butter to improve a baked 'Vivaldi's taste.

Botanical features of this variety include a tall plant with stems weakly pigmented and slightly swollen nodes. Terminal and primary leaflets are ovate, the flowers have orange anthers and a white corolla with a prominent star. The tubers have few shallow eyes with light yellow flesh and the sprouts are a red-violet.

Diseases resistances for this variety include, field immune to potato wart and it is highly resistant to PVA and PVY. Also, Vivaldi is moderately resistant to leaf roll, PVX, late blight on tuber, silver scurf, blackleg and black dot and is moderately susceptible to late blight on leaves, common scab, powdery scab, rhizoctonia and skin spot.

It was the winner in the Fresh Produce category at the Q Food and Drink awards in 2006 and won gold at The Grocer Label Awards in 2011.
It was awarded the RHS AGM.

References 

Potato cultivars
Science and technology in Lincolnshire
Antonio Vivaldi